The Tyrant of Padua (Italian: Il tiranno di Padova) is a 1946 Italian historical film directed by Max Neufeld and starring Clara Calamai, Carlo Lombardi and Elsa De Giorgi. It is an adaptation of the 1835 play Angelo, Tyrant of Padua by Victor Hugo. It is set in Padua in the 1540s.

Made by Scalera Films, it was shot at the Cinevillaggio Studios complex in Venice during the wartime Italian Social Republic. The film's sets were designed by the art director Luigi Scaccianoce and Ottavio Scotti.

Cast
 Carlo Lombardi as Angelo Malipieri  
 Clara Calamai as Tisbe  
 Elsa De Giorgi as Caterina Bragadin in Malipieri  
 Alfredo Varelli as Rodolfo degli Ezzelini  
 Nino Pavese as Una spia  
 Giorgio Piamonti as Omodei  
 Erminio Spalla as Un evaso  
 Carlo Micheluzzi as Il padre di Caterina  
 Olga Vittoria Gentilli as La madre di Tisbe  
 Memo Benassi as Cesare, il pittore 
 Andreina Carli as Reginella  
 Cristina Veronesi

References

Bibliography 
 Brunetta, Gian Piero. The History of Italian Cinema: A Guide to Italian Film from Its Origins to the Twenty-first Century.  Princeton University Press, 2009.

External links 
 

1946 films
Italian historical drama films
Italian black-and-white films
1940s historical drama films
1940s Italian-language films
Films directed by Max Neufeld
Italian films based on plays
Films based on works by Victor Hugo
Films set in Italy
Films set in the 1540s
1946 drama films
Films scored by Renzo Rossellini
1940s Italian films